There are several schools named for King Henry VIII, including:

 King Henry VIII School, Coventry, Coventry, England
 King Henry VIII Preparatory School, Coventry, England
 King Henry VIII Grammar School, Abergavenny, Wales